Landsman Lorenzo Denning (September 6, 1843 – February 8, 1865) was an American soldier who fought in the American Civil War. Denning received the country's highest award for bravery during combat, the Medal of Honor, for his action aboard USN Picket Boat Number One on 27 October 1864. He was awarded the medal on 31 December 1864, but died before it was presented to him.

Biography
Denning was born in Granby, Connecticut on 6 September 1843. He enlisted into the United States Navy. Denning was taken as a Prisoner of War on the day he performed the act of gallantry that earned him the Medal of Honor. He died on 8 February 1865 in a POW camp and his remains are interred in a trench of unknowns at Salisbury National Cemetery. There is an "In Memory Of" headstone in the family plot in Fairview Cemetery, New Britain, Connecticut.

Medal of Honor citation

See also

List of American Civil War Medal of Honor recipients: A–F

References

External links

1843 births
1865 deaths
People of Connecticut in the American Civil War
Union Navy sailors
United States Navy Medal of Honor recipients
American Civil War recipients of the Medal of Honor
Military personnel from Connecticut
American Civil War prisoners of war
Union military personnel killed in the American Civil War